Malawiella is a genus of beetles in the family Buprestidae, containing the following species:

 Malawiella bouyeri Curletti, 2004
 Malawiella divina (Obenberger, 1935)
 Malawiella obscuriviridis Bellamy, 1990

References

Buprestidae genera